Sproul may refer to:

People 
 Allan Sproul, American banker
 Daniel Sproul, member of the band Rose Hill Drive
 Elliott W. Sproul, U.S. Representative from Illinois
 Jacob Sproul, member of the band Rose Hill Drive
 Nathan Sproul, Republican strategist
 R. C. Sproul (1939–2017), American Christian theologian
 R. C. Sproul, Jr., American Christian theologian; son of R. C. Sproul
 Robert Gordon Sproul, eleventh President of the University of California
 William Cameron Sproul, 27th Governor of Pennsylvania
 William H. Sproul, U.S. Representative from Kansas

Places 
 Sproul, West Virginia
 Sproul Observatory
 Sproul Plaza
 Sproul State Forest
 Sproul, Pennsylvania

See also 
Kevin Sprouls, American illustrator
Sproule